There are three species of skink named spotted skink:

 Carinascincus ocellatus, native to Tasmania
 Flexiseps melanurus, native to Madagascar
 Eutropis madaraszi, native to Sri Lanka